Caty McNally and Iga Świątek won the girls' doubles tennis title at the 2018 French Open, defeating Yuki Naito and Naho Sato in the final, 6–2, 7–5.

Bianca Andreescu and Carson Branstine were the defending champions, however both players chose not to participate.

Seeds

Draw

Finals

Top half

Bottom half

External links 
 Draw

Girls' Doubles
French Open, 2018 Girls' Doubles